Rear Admiral (abbreviated as RADM) is a two-star commissioned armed flag officer rank in the Pakistan Navy, coast guards, and marines awarded by the Government of Pakistan to commodores as a position advancement in uniformed service. It is the third-highest rank in Pakistan armed services with a NATO code of OF-7, and while it is worn on epaulettes with a two-star insignia, it ranks above one-star rank Commodore and below three-star rank Vice admiral. Rear Admiral is equivalent to the rank of Major General of Pakistan Army and Air Vice Marshal of the Pakistan Air Force. Rear Admiral in the Pakistan Navy is a senior flag officer rank and is abbreviated as R/ADMPN to distinguish it from the same ranks offered in other countries, although there is no official abbreviation available for a Pakistani rear admiral. Rear admiral may be also called as two-star admiral to distinguish it from other insignias such as three-star Vice admiral and four-star admiral.

Appointment and promotion
Awarded by the Government of Pakistan to commodores as a position advancement in uniformed service.

Statutory limits
Since it's the third-highest rank coupled with additional powers and benefits, the law of Pakistan restricts the use of unsanctioned power by a two-star admiral and can be constraint under a certain constitutional amendment.

Gallery

References

Pakistan Navy ranks
Pakistan Navy